The Chinese cemetery of Dili is a historical cemetery in Dili, East Timor. Built in 1889 on land donated by the then Portuguese government, the oldest graves date back to the early 20th century.

In 2015, the cemetery had about 1,400 tombs and was still maintained by the local Chinese community.

References

External links
 

East Timor

Ethnic groups in East Timor
 
History of East Timor
History of Timor
Timor